Adira Mela is a town in the Federally Administered Tribal Areas of Pakistan. It is located at 32°34'21N 70°1'9E with an altitude of 1376 metres (4517 feet).

References

Populated places in Khyber Pakhtunkhwa